Marlies Raich (née Schild, born 31 May 1981) is a retired Austrian World Cup alpine ski racer. She specializes in the technical disciplines of slalom and giant slalom. Schild won four Olympic medals, with silvers in the combined (2006) and slalom (2010, 2014) and a bronze in slalom (2006). She has seven World Championship medals and has won five World Cup season titles.

Schild completed her World Cup career with 37 wins, all but two in slalom. She retired from international competition at age 33 in September 2014.

Ski racing career
Born in Admont, Styria, Schild initially preferred the downhill event. However, by the age of 19 she had already undergone five knee surgeries, prompting her to concentrate on the less dangerous slalom and giant slalom competitions.
Since 2004, she has finished every season (except 2009 when out with injury) among the top 3 in the World Cup slalom standings, and won the slalom trophy in 2007, 2008 and 2011. Her best result in the overall competition was a second place in 2007, when she lost the overall trophy only in the last two races (slalom and giant slalom) against compatriot Nicole Hosp, after having taken the lead with a second place in downhill and a third place in super-G on the first two days of the World Cup final 2007 in Lenzerheide.

While training for the giant slalom in October 2008, Schild fell and sustained a comminuted fracture in her left tibia and fibula, as well as a fractured tibial head. This severe injury sidelined Schild for the entire 2009 season. A few weeks after her return to competition in Levi in November 2009, she celebrated her first victory after the injury, winning the slalom in Lienz on 29 December. Starting with this win, Schild reached the podium in all FIS slalom races she finished for over two years, including the 2010 Olympics in Vancouver (silver medal) and the 2011 World Championships in Garmisch-Partenkirchen (gold medal). Her podium-run ended on 10 March 2012, when she finished 6th at the slalom at Åre. Schild has not competed in downhill or super-G since her injury. (Ref. Bio Patrick Lang)

After Schild tore ligaments in her right knee on 20 December 2012 in Sweden, it was announced that she would miss most of the 2013 season, including the 2013 World Championships in Schladming. On 13 February, Schild announced her plans to compete in the slalom three days later, only 58 days after the injury. She managed a top ten result with a ninth-place finish.

With 35 World Cup victories in slalom, Schild lead the career list in that discipline until Mikaela Shiffrin surpassed her on December 29, 2018. She has at least two World Cup podiums in each of the five alpine disciplines, with over fifty in slalom.

World championships
At the 2003 World Championships in St. Moritz, Switzerland, she placed second in the slalom behind Janica Kostelić, and in 2005 at Bormio, Italy, she won a bronze medal in the combined, behind Janica Kostelić and Anja Pärson.  In 2007 at Åre, Sweden, Schild won silver in the slalom and bronze in the combined. In team events she won gold 2007 in Åre and silver in 2011 at Garmisch-Partenkirchen, Germany.

Olympics
At the 2006 Winter Olympic Games in Turin, Schild won a silver medal in combined and a bronze medal in the slalom; in the giant slalom, she placed 17th. In 2010 in Vancouver, Schild improved to another silver in the slalom at Whistler and she repeated this in 2014 in the slalom at Sochi.  She also competed in 2002 in Salt Lake, but did not finish the slalom at Deer Valley.

Personal
Schild is married to Austrian ski racer Benjamin Raich. Her sister Bernadette (b. 1990) is also a World Cup racer;
they made the same podium twice during the 2014 season, at Courchevel in December and Kranjska Gora in February.

World Cup results

Season titles
 5 titles – (4 slalom, 1 combined)

Season standings

Race victories
 37 wins – (1 giant slalom, 35 slalom, 1 combined)

World Championship results

Olympic results

References

External links
 
 

  

1981 births
Austrian female alpine skiers
Alpine skiers at the 2002 Winter Olympics
Alpine skiers at the 2006 Winter Olympics
Alpine skiers at the 2010 Winter Olympics
Alpine skiers at the 2014 Winter Olympics
Olympic alpine skiers of Austria
Medalists at the 2006 Winter Olympics
Medalists at the 2010 Winter Olympics
Medalists at the 2014 Winter Olympics
Olympic medalists in alpine skiing
Olympic silver medalists for Austria
Olympic bronze medalists for Austria
FIS Alpine Ski World Cup champions
People from Liezen District
Living people
Sportspeople from Styria
20th-century Austrian women
21st-century Austrian women